Juan José Calderón Enríquez (born February 17, 1991, in Tlajomulco de Zúñiga, Jalisco), known as Juan Calderón, is a former Mexican professional footballer.

External links
 

1991 births
Living people
Footballers from Jalisco
Association football midfielders
Deportivo Toluca F.C. players
Club León footballers
Tlaxcala F.C. players
Venados F.C. players
Las Vegas Lights FC players
Liga MX players
Mexican expatriate footballers
Expatriate soccer players in the United States
Mexican expatriate sportspeople in the United States
Mexican footballers